Sir Sidney Job Pocock  (20 September 1855 – 1931) was a British businessman, magistrate, writer, Liberal Party politician and an authority on prisons.

Background
Pocock was born the son of Abraham Pocock and Lydia née Keevil of Stanford Park, Berkshire.

In 1890 he married Annie Cousens (d.1900). They had one son and three daughters.

In 1915 he married Kate Ethel Lankester (d.1925).

Pocock was knighted in 1912. On 28 April 1931 he died at Surbiton Hall, Kingston upon Thames, at the age of 76. His columnar gravestone at Wimbledon is surmounted by a cornice and large shrouded urn or amphora.

Professional career
Pocock inherited an interest in farming. He made his career as a businessman. He was prominent in the dairy industry. In 1907 he was appointed a Justice of the Peace for Middlesex and presided over the Spelthorne Petty Sessions. His experiences as a Magistrate led him to take a particular interest in the prison system. He visited many prisons, recording his observations and experiences which he had published in 1930, under the title 'The Prisoner and the Prison'.

Political career
Pocock was a member of the Eighty Club, a political London gentlemen's club which had a strong association with the Liberal Party. He was Liberal candidate for the Uxbridge division of Middlesex at the 1906 General Election. Uxbridge was a safe Conservative seat, so much so that no Liberal candidate contested the previous general elections in 1895 and 1900. The Liberals swept to power nationally and the tide nearly took Pocock into parliament. He lost by just 145 votes. Four years later, at the January 1910 General Election, he once again contested Uxbridge but this time the Conservative won comfortably. Later that year, he switched constituencies and was Liberal candidate for the Devizes division of Wiltshire at the December 1910 General Election. Devizes was a better seat for the Liberals, they had won it in 1906. The Conservatives had won it back in January 1910. Pocock was unable to wrestle the seat back and the Conservative held on by just over 700 votes. He did not stand for parliament again.

Electoral record

References

1855 births
1931 deaths
Liberal Party (UK) parliamentary candidates
English justices of the peace